The Blohm & Voss P 170 was a three-engined unarmed fast bomber and ground-attack aircraft project proposed by the aircraft manufacturer Blohm & Voss to the Luftwaffe during the Second World War.

Design
Designed by Richard Vogt in 1942, the P 170 was intended to meet a requirement for a schnellbomber, a bomber capable of outrunning contemporary interceptors, and which would then not need any defensive armament. Accommodating a crew of two, it was to have been  powered with three BMW 801D radial engines. Three different configurations were proposed, two with the bomb aimer buried in the fuselage ahead of the pilot, with or without additional side windows, and the other with the gunner behind the pilot under a continuous greenhouse type canopy.

The layout was unusual, with two of the three engines mounted on the wingtips of the straight untapered shoulder-mounted wing. To balance so much weight ahead of the wing, the crew were moved as far aft as possible in the cylindrical fuselage to a tandem cockpit just ahead of the tailplane. The outer engines nacelles were each fitted with a small tail fin and rudder. The outboard location distributed the aircraft weight across the span, reducing the stress loads and weight of the wing structure. Steel was to be used extensively throughout its construction, with wooden control surfaces.

The main undercarriage comprised three identical retractable units just behind each engine and retracting up underneath the main fuel tanks. A single relatively large tailwheel retracted up behind the cockpit.

Three variants were proposed but none were built.

Specifications

See also
List of German aircraft projects, 1939–45
Aircraft of comparable role, configuration and era
Blohm & Voss P 163
de Havilland Mosquito

References

Notes

Bibliography

External links

P 170
Abandoned military aircraft projects of Germany
Trimotors
High-wing aircraft